Charles Rhubin Cozart (October 17, 1919 – December 31, 2004) was a Major League Baseball pitcher who appeared in five games, all in relief, for the Boston Braves in 1945.

Cozart is one of many ballplayers who only appeared in the major leagues during World War II. He made his major league debut on April 17, 1945 (Opening Day) against the New York Giants at Braves Field. Three days later he gained his first and only big league win in a 6–5 road victory over the Philadelphia Phillies at Shibe Park. His last appearance for the Braves was on June 14, and then he was traded to the New York Yankees organization almost two months later.

In a total of 8 innings pitched Cozart was 1–0 with 1 game finished. He was very ineffective overall, as he allowed 25 baserunners (10 hits and 15 walks) for an extremely high WHIP of 3.125. The 9 earned runs he gave up saddled him with a final ERA of 10.13. He proved to be a good fielder during his short time at the major league level, however, recording 7 assists without committing an error.

Cozart eventually returned to his native Caldwell County, North Carolina and became a deputy sheriff there. He died at the age of 85 in Lenoir, North Carolina.

References

External links 

Major League Baseball pitchers
Baseball players from North Carolina
Boston Braves players
1919 births
2004 deaths
People from Lenoir, North Carolina
Place of birth missing